Jacco Eltingh and Paul Haarhuis were the defending champions but were eliminated in the round robin.

Greg Rusedski and Fabrice Santoro  defeated Thomas Enqvist and Mark Philippoussis in the final, 6–7(3–7), 6–4, [11–9] to win the gentlemen's invitation doubles tennis title at the 2012 Wimbledon Championships.

Draw

Final

Group A
Standings are determined by: 1. number of wins; 2. number of matches; 3. in two-players-ties, head-to-head records; 4. in three-players-ties, percentage of sets won, or of games won; 5. steering-committee decision.

Group B
Standings are determined by: 1. number of wins; 2. number of matches; 3. in two-players-ties, head-to-head records; 4. in three-players-ties, percentage of sets won, or of games won; 5. steering-committee decision.

References
Draw

Men's Invitation Doubles